Dzięcioły-Kolonia  is a village in the administrative district of Gmina Sterdyń, within Sokołów County, Masovian Voivodeship, in eastern Poland.

References

Villages in Sokołów County